Maiya Early (born 2002), known professionally as Maiya The Don, is an American rapper and songwriter. She is best known for the song "Telfy."

Life and career 
Born Maiya Early in Brooklyn, New York, she enjoyed rapping from her youth and would battle rap her brother. Using the name Maiya The Don, she initially used her TikTok to produce beauty related content. In 2022, when she had approximately 500,000 followers she shifted to making and releasing rap music. She has used TikTok to build her fan base, in particular gaining notice for the songs "Chiraq" and "222." 

Her breakout single "Telfy" was released in October 2022, and garnered approximately one million views on YouTube. The song refers to the popular shopping handbag from the luxury brand Telfar. Sheldon Pearce of NPR described the song: "its energy is really powered by Maiya's swaggering, self-assured performance. As she rumbles through the verses, she is putting everyone in her line of sight on notice."

In January 2023 she and fellow Brooklyn rapper Lola Brooke were featured artists on the "Conceited" remix by Flo Milli. Maiya performed at MEFeater's Galentine's show at New York Fashion Week.

In March 2023, she was selected by TikTok as an inaugural Visionary Voices honoree to celebrate their #WomeninHipHop campaign.

References

External links 
 Maiya The Don on TikTok
 "Telfy" on YouTube

2002 births
Living people
American women rappers
Rappers from Brooklyn
Entertainers from New York City
African-American women rappers